is a passenger railway station  located in the town of  Kotoura, Tottori Prefecture, Japan. It is operated by the West Japan Railway Company (JR West).

Lines

Station layout
The station consists of one ground-level side platform serving a single bi-direcional track. The station building is on the right side facing Yonago. The station is unattended.

History
Yabase Station opened on July 4, 1928 as a temporary seasonal stop. It was upgraded to a year-round station on August 20, 1938. With the privatization of the Japan National Railways (JNR) on April 1, 1987, the station came under the aegis of the West Japan Railway Company.

Passenger statistics
In fiscal 2018, the station was used by an average of 142 passengers daily.

Surrounding area
Yabase Castle ruins
Yabase Beach
Kotoura Municipal Yabase Elementary School

See also
List of railway stations in Japan

References

External links 

 Yabase Station from JR-Odekake.net 

Railway stations in Tottori Prefecture
Stations of West Japan Railway Company
Sanin Main Line
Railway stations in Japan opened in 1928
Kotoura, Tottori